This is a list of historic places in Northern Ontario, containing heritage sites listed on the Canadian Register of Historic Places (CRHP), all of which are designated as historic places either locally, provincially, territorially, nationally, or by more than one level of government. Listings in Greater Sudbury are listed separately.

List of historic places outside Greater Sudbury

Algoma District

Cochrane District

Kenora District

Manitoulin District

Nipissing District

Rainy River District

Sudbury District

Thunder Bay District

Timiskaming District

See also

List of historic places in Ontario
List of National Historic Sites of Canada in Ontario

References

Northern Ontario